Air stagnation is a phenomenon which occurs when an air mass remains over an area for an extended period.  Stagnation events strongly correlates with poor air quality. Due to light winds and lack of precipitation, pollutants cannot be cleared from the air, either gaseous (such as ozone) or particulate (such as soot or dust).  Subsidence produced directly under the subtropical ridge can lead to a buildup of particulates in urban areas under the ridge, leading to widespread haze.  If the low level relative humidity rises towards 100 percent overnight, fog can form.  In the United States, the National Weather Service issues an Air Stagnation Advisory when these conditions are likely to occur.

In the U.S., the numbers of stagnation days during winter and spring tend to be much smaller than those during summer and fall. Spatial variations during winter and spring tend to be incoherent as well.

References

Air pollution
Atmospheric circulation